Harold Turnbull (born 1947) is an Australian former professional tennis player.

A left-handed player from Queensland, Turnbull was a state champion who was active on tour in the late 1960s and early 1970s. Retiring at the age of 20 due to a back injury, he was appointed tennis director of the Palm Desert Racquet Club in California in 1972. He made a brief comeback and in 1973 featured in the singles main draw at Wimbledon.

Turnbull's younger sister Wendy was a nine-time grand slam doubles champion. One of his brothers, John, was a premiership player for Sandgate in the Queensland Football League.

References

External links
 
 

1947 births
Living people
Australian male tennis players
Tennis people from Queensland